Beyhan Ametov (born 18 October 1998) is a professional footballer who plays as a forward for  club SV Meppen. Born in Germany, he has represented North Macedonia at youth level.

Club career
Born in Wuppertal, Ametov played youth football for Wuppertaler SV and 1. FC Köln before starting his senior career at Borussia Dortmund II in 2017. He returned to Wuppertaler SV in July 2019 before signing for 3. Liga side SV Meppen in summer 2021.

International career
Born in Germany, Ametov is of Macedonian descent. He has represented North Macedonia internationally at under-17, under-18, under-19 and under-20 levels.

Career statistics

References

External links

1998 births
Living people
German footballers
Macedonian footballers
German people of Macedonian descent
Sportspeople from Wuppertal
Footballers from North Rhine-Westphalia
Association football forwards
Wuppertaler SV players
1. FC Köln players
Borussia Dortmund players
SV Meppen players
3. Liga players
Regionalliga players
North Macedonia youth international footballers